Khir Sar (also Romanized as Khīr Sar; also known as Kareh Sar, Kashk Sarā, and Khīreh Sar) is a village in Kheyrud Kenar Rural District, in the Central District of Nowshahr County, Mazandaran Province, Iran. At the 2006 census, its population was 1,261, in 308 families.

References 

Populated places in Nowshahr County